Sara Delma Byron (July 31, 1913 – May 29, 2006) was an American dancer and actress. She also acted under the names Sally Bynum, Sally Bynam and Brook Byron. It was under this name that she portrayed Sally Cato MacDougall in Auntie Mame.

Career
The daughter of Sam and Minnie Pearl Harris Bynum, Byron was born in Weakley County, Tennessee but lived in Akron, Ohio as a teenager, attending Garfield High School.

She attended Murray College for one year. Leaving college, she became a dancer in a touring troupe The Band Box Revue. Later, she became a model, attracting attention from Hollywood as her picture appeared on magazine covers. In 1936, Byron received a stock contract from 20th Century Fox, giving her a chance in films.

Her Broadway credits as Delma Byron include The Leading Lady (1948) and Up in Central Park (1945). As Sally Bynum, she performed in Life Begins at 8:40 (1934) and Roberta (1933) on Broadway. On radio, Byron portrayed Diane Pers in the soap opera Kate Hopkins, Angel of Mercy.

Filmography

She also appeared on television in The Untouchables, Richard Diamond, Private Detective, M Squad and others.

References

External links
  Brook Byron imdb
 Delma Byron | Those obscure objects of desire

2006 deaths
1913 births
Actresses from Tennessee
American female dancers
Dancers from Tennessee
20th-century American dancers
20th-century American women
21st-century American women